Gunin is a 2022 Bangladeshi supernatural romance film directed by Giasuddin Selim. He also wrote the screenplay, based on Hasan Azizul Huq's short story of the same name. The film stars Pori Moni, Sariful Razz, Dilara Zaman, Iresh Zaker, Mostafa Monwar, and Azad Abul Kalam. It is produced and distributed by Chorki and was released on theatre on 11 March 2022.

Premise
Gunin is set in a rural area of 50 years ago. It is the story of a farmer from a village where paranormal activities were cast out at a dan located outside the village.

Cast
 Pori Moni 
 Sariful Razz 
 Iresh Zaker 
 Mostafa Monwar 
 Azad Abul Kalam 
 Dilara Zaman
 Naila Azad Nupur 
 Jhuna Chowdhury
 Shilpi Sarkar Apu
 Nasir Uddin Khan
 Jahangir Alam
 Sumaiya Chowdhury
 Bithy Rani Sarker
 Shafiul Alam Babu

Crew
 Zuairijah Mou as Executive Producer & Chief AD
 Yeamin Muzumder as Casting Director
 Mikhail Najmul as Art Director
 Samiun Jahan Dola as Costume Designer
 Turan Munshi as Line Producer
 Forhad Reza Milon as Make-up Artist
 Emon Chowdhury as Music Composer 
 Sharif Ahmed as Editor 
 Kamrul Hasan Khosru as Cinematographer

Production
Nusraat Faria was set to play the character Rabeya in the film. But later, she left the film due to a schedule conflict, and Pori Moni replaced her. Principal photography took place in Brahmanbaria and Manikganj. Filming began on 10 October 2021. And the director wrapped up the shooting on 30 October 2021.

Release
Gunin was released in theatres on 11 March 2022, followed by a digital streaming release on Chorki on 24 March 2022.

Reception
Shadique Mahbub Islam of The Financial Express criticized the lack of plot depth of the film.

References

External links
 

2022 films
2022 romance films
Chorki original films
Bengali-language Bangladeshi films
Adaptations of works by Hasan Azizul Huq
Supernatural romantic films